The Arubaanse Voetbal Bond is the governing body of football in Aruba.  Its headquarters are at Frans Figaroa sports complex in the city of Noord. It's a member of FIFA and is responsible for governing amateur and professional football, including the men's, and youth national teams. The AVB is also responsible for sanctioning referees and football tournaments for most football leagues in Aruba.

Professional Leagues
The Division di Honor is the first division football league in Aruba.  It comprises 10 teams and is fed by Division One, and Division Two. The AVB also runs the women's football league, and Juniors for U-20 teams.

Since 2005 the AVB has operated the Betico Croes Tournament Cup for men's teams in all three divisions.

Association staff

Associations Affiliated with AVB

Adult Level
Aruba national football team
Aruba women's national football team

Youth Level
Aruba U-21 national football team
Aruba U-20 national football team
Aruba U-17 national football team
Aruba U-15 national football team
Aruba U-13 national football team

Women
Aruba women's U-20 national football team
Aruba women's U-17 national football team
Aruba women's U-15 national football team
Aruba women's U-13 national football team

References

External links
 Official website
 Aruba at the FIFA website
 Aruba at CONCACAF site

CONCACAF member associations
Football in Aruba
Sports governing bodies in Aruba
1932 establishments in Aruba
Sports organizations established in 1932